Kuga is a former settlement in the Municipality of Moravče in central Slovenia. It is now part of the village of Drtija. The area is part of the traditional region of Upper Carniola. The municipality is now included in the Central Slovenia Statistical Region.

Geography
Kuga lies southwest of the village center of Drtija, below the northwest slope of the Slivna Plateau.

History
Kuga was annexed by Drtija in 1952, ending its existence as an independent settlement.

References

External links

Kuga (unlabeled) with Podbrdo on Geopedia

Populated places in the Municipality of Moravče
Former settlements in Slovenia